The European greenfinch or simply the greenfinch (Chloris chloris) is a small passerine bird in the finch family Fringillidae.

This bird is widespread throughout Europe, North Africa and Southwest Asia. It is mainly resident, but some northernmost populations migrate further south. The greenfinch has also been introduced into Australia, New Zealand, Uruguay, and Argentina.

Taxonomy

The greenfinch was described by Carl Linnaeus in his landmark 1758 10th edition of Systema Naturae under the binomial name Loxia chloris. The specific epithet is from khloris, the Ancient Greek name for this bird, from khloros, "green".

The finch family, Fringillidae, is divided into two subfamilies, the Carduelinae, containing around 28 genera with 141 species and the Fringillinae containing a single genus, Fringilla, with four species. The finch family are all seed-eaters with stout conical bills. They have similar skull morphologies, nine large primaries, 12 tail feathers and no crop. In all species the female bird builds the nest, incubates the eggs and broods the young. Fringilline finches raise their young almost entirely on arthropods, while the cardueline finches raise their young on regurgitated seeds.

A molecular phylogenetic study published in 2012 found that the greenfinches are not closely related to other members of the genus Carduelis. They have therefore been placed in the resurrected genus Chloris that had originally been introduced by the French naturalist Georges Cuvier in 1800, with the European greenfinch as the type species.

Subspecies
There are 10 recognised subspecies.

Description
It is similar in size and shape to a house sparrow, but is mainly green, with yellow in the wings and tail. The female and young birds are duller and have brown tones on the back. The bill is thick and conical. The song contains a lot of trilling twitters interspersed with wheezes, and the male has a "butterfly" display flight. 
Male greenfinch birds exhibit higher degrees of fluctuating asymmetry. The development of bones of males may be more easily disrupted than that of females.

Behaviour and ecology

Woodland edges, farmland hedges and gardens with relatively thick vegetation are favoured for breeding. It nests in trees or bushes, laying 3 to 6 eggs.

This species can form large flocks outside the breeding season, sometimes mixing with other finches and buntings. They feed largely on seeds, but also take berries.

Reproduction

Breeding season occurs in spring, starting in the second half of March, until June, with fledging young in early July. Incubation lasts about 13–14 days, by the female. The male feeds her at the nest during this period. Chicks are covered with thick, long, greyish-white down at hatching. They are fed on insect larvae by both adults during the first days, and later, by a frequently regurgitated yellowish paste made of seeds. They leave the nest about 13 days later, but they are not able to fly. Usually, they fledge 16–18 days after hatching. This species produces two or three broods per year.

In Australasia, the European greenfinch's breeding season is from October to March.

Predators and parasites
The protozoal parasite Trichomonas gallinae was known to infect pigeons and raptors, but, beginning in Great Britain in 2005, carcasses of dead European greenfinches and common chaffinches were found to be infected with the parasite. The disease spread and in 2008, infected carcasses were found in Norway, Sweden and Finland and a year later in Germany. The spread of the disease is believed to have been mediated by common chaffinches, as large numbers of the birds breed in northern Europe and winter in Great Britain. In Great Britain, the number of infected carcasses recovered each year declined after a peak in 2006. There was a reduction in the number of European greenfinches from around 4.3 million to around 2.8 million, but no significant decline in the overall number of common chaffinches. A similar pattern occurred in Finland where, after the arrival of the disease in 2008, there was a reduction in the number of European greenfinches but only a small change in the number of common chaffinches.

In literature
The English poet William Wordsworth wrote a poem about this species entitled The Green Linnet in 1803.

References

Sources

External links

Audio recordings from Xeno-canto
 Videos and photos from the Internet Bird Collection
 Ageing and sexing by Javier Blasco-Zumeta & Gerd-Michael Heinze 
 Feathers of European greenfinch (Carduelis chloris) 

Chloris (bird)
Finches
Birds of Europe
Birds described in 1758
Taxa named by Carl Linnaeus